Willis Thomas Owen (born September 1, 1952) is a former American football quarterback who played in ten National Football League (NFL) seasons from 1974–1982 for the San Francisco 49ers, the New England Patriots, the Washington Redskins, and the New York Giants. He played college football at Wichita State University and was drafted in the thirteenth round of the 1974 NFL Draft.

References

1952 births
Living people
American football quarterbacks
New England Patriots players
New York Giants players
Washington Redskins players
San Francisco 49ers players
Wichita State Shockers football players
Players of American football from Shreveport, Louisiana